Saint Jerome in His Study is an oil painting on panel attributed to the workshop of the early Netherlandish painter Jan van Eyck, dated to 1442 (the year after the master's death) and now in the Detroit Institute of Arts, Detroit.

History
Since the date on the painting is subsequent to Jan van Eyck's death (June 1441), it is likely that the work, left unfinished, had been completed by members of his workshop, or his brother Lambert.

A work with a similar subject is mentioned in the inventories of  Palazzo Medici in Florence, which had been drawn up after the death of Lorenzo de' Medici in 1492. Even if not the work now at Detroit, this could have been the latter's prototype, since the painting is not unanimously attributed to van Eyck. There are indeed striking similarities between this work and Domenico Ghirlandaio's Saint Jerome in His Study (1480).

Description

The painting depicts Saint Jerome in the traditional representation inside his study. He wears a cardinal's dress and hat, and is reading a book, in a small study clogged with numerous objects showing his erudition and interests. Below is a lion, recalling the saint's legend in which he had extracted a thorn from the paw of the animal, who had later remained loyal to him. The light enters from a window behind the writing desk and from the foreground, in order to illuminate any detail of the scene. Objects on the desk and the shelves include an hourglass, a pounce pot, a ruler, an astrolabe, numerous books and writing instruments, all suitable for the idealized Renaissance man.

See also
Saint Jerome in His Study (Ghirlandaio)
 St Jerome in His Study (Antonello da Messina)

Sources

1442 paintings
Paintings by Jan van Eyck
Paintings in the collection of the Detroit Institute of Arts
Lions in art
Van Eyck
Books in art